Tundra, in comics, may refer to:

 Tundra (comic strip), an Alaska comic strip that started in 1991
 Tundra (Marvel Comics), a Marvel Comics character

See also
 Tundra (disambiguation)
 Tundra Publishing, a comics publisher